Kostaryata is a rural locality (a village) in Frolovskoye Rural Settlement, Permsky District, Perm Krai, Russia. The population was 27 as of 2010. There are 7 streets.

Geography 
Kostaryata is located 15 km southeast of Perm (the district's administrative centre) by road. Deriby is the nearest rural locality.

References 

Rural localities in Permsky District